Kitab al-Aghani, is an encyclopedic collection of poems and songs that runs to over 20 volumes in modern editions, attributed to the 10th-century Arabic writer Abu al-Faraj al-Isfahani (also known as al-Isbahani). Abu al-Faraj claimed to have taken 50 years in writing the work, which ran to over 10 000 pages and contains more than 16,000 verses of Arabic poetry. It can be seen as having three distinct sections: the first dealing with the '100 Best Songs' chosen for the caliph Harun al-Rashid, the second with royal composers and the third with songs chosen by the author himself. It spans the period from pre-Islamic times to the end of the 9th century CE. Abu al-Faraj importantly included performance directions for many of the songs included in Kitab al-Aghani. Due to the accompanying biographical annotations on the personages', the work is an important historical and historical source; it is also useful for those interested in the sociology of Arabic literature.

Reception
The prominent 14th-century historian Ibn Khaldun called The Book of Songs the register of the Arabs: "It comprises all that they had achieved in past of excellence in every kind of poetry, history, music, etc. So far as I am aware, no other book can be put on a level with it in this respect. It is the final resource of the student of belles lettres and leaves him nothing further to be desired".

Editions

See also

Abu al-Faraj al-Isfahani
Hamasah
Imru' al-Qais
Maqama
Mu'allaqat
Mufaddaliyat

References

Music of the medieval Islamic world
10th-century Arabic books
10th-century encyclopedias
Arabic non-fiction books
Arabic-language encyclopedias
Arabic anthologies
Biographical dictionaries
Encyclopedias of music
Love in Arabic literature
Medieval Arabic literature
Medieval Arabic poems
Medieval music manuscript sources